Dan Payne (born June 7, 1966 in New Westminster, British Columbia, raised in Port Coquitlam, British Columbia) is a former professional Canadian football offensive lineman who played fourteen seasons in the Canadian Football League for four teams, mostly at right guard. He attended Purdue University on a full football/wrestling scholarship before transferring to Simon Fraser University.  He played football and wrestled at  Simon Fraser University. He was a member of four Grey Cup-winning teams: the Saskatchewan Roughriders (1989), the Toronto Argonauts (1996, 1997), and the B.C. Lions (2000). During his career, he also played for Hamilton.

Prior to his football career, he competed as an amateur wrestler, winning two NAIA national championships. In international competition, he won bronze at the 1987 Pan American Games in freestyle and Greco-Roman before representing Canada in the 1988 Seoul Olympics, where he competed in both the freestyle (6th place) and Greco-Roman (13th place) competitions in the 130 kg division.

References

1966 births
BC Lions players
Canadian football offensive linemen
Hamilton Tiger-Cats players
Living people
Canadian male sport wrestlers
Olympic wrestlers of Canada
Pan American Games bronze medalists for Canada
People from Port Coquitlam
Players of Canadian football from British Columbia
Saskatchewan Roughriders players
Canadian players of American football
Purdue Boilermakers football players
Simon Fraser Clan football players
Simon Fraser University alumni
Sportspeople from New Westminster
Toronto Argonauts players
Wrestlers at the 1988 Summer Olympics
Pan American Games medalists in wrestling
Wrestlers at the 1987 Pan American Games
Medalists at the 1987 Pan American Games